The 2017 Irish Hills 250 was the 13th stock car race of the 2017 NASCAR Xfinity Series season and the 26th iteration of the event. The race was held on Saturday, June 17, 2017, in Brooklyn, Michigan at Michigan International Speedway, a two-mile (3.2 km) permanent moderate-banked D-shaped speedway. The race took the scheduled 125 laps to complete. At race's end, Denny Hamlin, driving for Joe Gibbs Racing, would win in a close finish on the final restart with two to go. The win was Hamlin's 16th career NASCAR Xfinity Series win and his first win of the season. To fill out the podium, William Byron and Elliott Sadler, both driving for JR Motorsports, would finish second and third, respectively.

Background 

The race was held at Michigan International Speedway, a two-mile (3.2 km) moderate-banked D-shaped speedway located in Brooklyn, Michigan. The track is used primarily for NASCAR events. It is known as a "sister track" to Texas World Speedway as MIS's oval design was a direct basis of TWS, with moderate modifications to the banking in the corners, and was used as the basis of Auto Club Speedway. The track is owned by International Speedway Corporation. Michigan International Speedway is recognized as one of motorsports' premier facilities because of its wide racing surface and high banking (by open-wheel standards; the 18-degree banking is modest by stock car standards).

Entry list 

 (R) denotes rookie driver.
 (i) denotes driver who is ineligible for series driver points.

Practice

First practice 
The first practice session was held on Friday, July 18, at 12:30 PM EST. The session would last for 55 minutes.

Second and final practice 
The second and final practice session, sometimes referred to as Happy Hour, was held on Friday, July 18, at 3:00 PM EST. The session would last for 55 minutes.

Qualifying 
Qualifying was held on Saturday, June 17, at 10:00 AM EST. Since Michigan International Speedway is at least , the qualifying system was a single car, single lap, two round system where in the first round, everyone would set a time to determine positions 13–40. Then, the fastest 12 qualifiers would move on to the second round to determine positions 1–12.

No drivers would fail to qualify.

Full qualifying results

Race results 
Stage 1 Laps: 30

Stage 2 Laps: 30

Stage 3 Laps: 65

Standings after the race 

Drivers' Championship standings

Note: Only the first 12 positions are included for the driver standings.

References 

2017 NASCAR Xfinity Series
NASCAR races at Michigan International Speedway
June 2017 sports events in the United States
2017 in sports in Michigan